5 Pashons - Coptic calendar - 7 Pashons

Fixed commemorations
All fixed commemorations below are observed on 6 Pashons (14 May) by the Coptic Orthodox Church.

Saints
Saint Isaac of Dafra
Saint Macarius of Alexandria (395 A.D.)
Saint Paphnutius of Al Bandarah

Days of the Coptic calendar